Gottfried Heinrich Bach (26 February 1724 – 12 February 1763) was the firstborn son of Johann Sebastian Bach by his second wife Anna Magdalena Wilcke. He was born in Leipzig, where his parents had moved the year before his birth.

Gottfried Heinrich became "feeble-minded" (mildly mentally disabled in some way) at an early age, but he played the keyboard well and C. P. E. Bach is quoted as saying that he showed "a great genius, which however failed to develop". He possibly composed: for instance the melody of the aria "So oft ich meine Tobackspfeife", BWV 515, contained in the second Notebook for Anna Magdalena Bach, may be his.

After his father's death in 1750 Gottfried Heinrich lived with his younger sister Elisabeth Juliane Friederica and her husband Johann Christoph Altnickol. After his brother-in-law's death in 1759 Gottfried Heinrich stayed in Naumburg with his sister until his own death a few years later.

Notes

1724 births
1763 deaths
Gottfried Heinrich
Pupils of Johann Sebastian Bach
Musicians from Leipzig
German people with disabilities